Cellebrite is an Israeli digital intelligence company that provides tools for federal, state, and local law enforcement as well as enterprise companies and service providers to collect, review, analyze and manage digital data. On April 8, 2021, Cellebrite announced plans to go public via a merger with a blank-check firm, valuing the company at approximately $2.4 billion. Their flagship product series is the Cellebrite UFED.

Overview
Cellebrite is headquartered in Petah Tikva, Israel. It has fourteen offices around the globe, including business centers in Washington, D.C., US, Munich, Germany, and Singapore. Cellebrite is a fully owned subsidiary of Sun Corporation based in Nagoya, Japan.

In 2017, Cellebrite's Mobile Lifecycle division was rebranded as Mobilogy.

Mobilogy produces hardware and software for phone-to-phone data transfer, backup, mobile applications electronic software distribution, and data analysis tools. Mobilogy products are used by various mobile operators, and are deployed in wireless retail points of sale. Mobilogy works with handset manufacturers to ensure compatibility before devices are released to the public.

Cellebrite's mobile forensics division was established in 2007 and produces digital forensics and intelligence tools for use by law enforcement, intelligence agencies, military branches, corporate security and investigations, law firms; and private digital forensic examiners.

History
Cellebrite was established in Israel in 1999 by Avi Yablonka, Yaron Baratz, and Yuval Aflalo.

Ron Serber joined Cellebrite in 2001 and Yossi Carmil joined in 2004. Since 2005 they both served as Co-CEO's until Ron Serber left the company in 2020.

Yossi Carmil is the current company CEO.

Cellebrite first manufactured hardware and software that offered a compressive phone-to-phone data transfer devices,  contact synchronization and content transfer tools for mobile phones, intended for use by wireless carrier sales and support staff in retail stores.

In 2007, Cellebrite established an independent division targeted at the mobile forensics industry.

That year, Cellebrite was acquired by FutureDial Incorporated and one of its major shareholders, Sun Corporation in Japan. Today Sun Corporation is Cellebrite's largest shareholder. In 2019 Israeli Growth Partners (IGP) invested $110 million in Cellebrite.

In 2020, Cellebrite acquired BlackBag Technologies, a forensics company with a focus on computer forensics. The acquisition allowed Cellebrite to expand its digital intelligence solution offerings to include data collection tools from computers.

In 2021, Cellebrite announced a business combination agreement and plan of merger with TWC Tech Holdings II Corporation. Once completed, Cellebrite would become a publicly listed company on the Nasdaq under the new ticker symbol, “CLBT”; the pro forma implied equity value of Cellebrite post-merger is expected to be approximately $2.4 billion.

Technology 
In 2019, Cellebrite announced a new version of the UFED, called the UFED Premium. The company claimed that it can unlock iOS devices including those running iOS 12.3 and Android phones such as the Galaxy S9.

In 2021, Moxie Marlinspike, creator of the encrypted messaging app Signal, pointed to a number of vulnerabilities in Cellebrite's UFED and Physical Analyzer software that allowed for arbitrary code execution on Windows computers running the software. One exploit he detailed involved the UFED scanning a specially formatted file which could then be used to execute arbitrary code on the computer running the UFED. Marlinspike wrote that the code could then "[modify] not just the Cellebrite report being created in that scan, but also all previous and future generated Cellebrite reports from all previously scanned devices and all future scanned devices in any arbitrary way". Marlinspike also found that Cellebrite software was bundled with out-of-date FFmpeg DLL files from 2012, which lacked over 100 subsequent security updates. Windows Installer packages, extracted from the Windows installer for iTunes and signed by Apple, were also found, which he said raised legal concerns. Cellebrite responded that the company "is committed to protecting the integrity of our customers' data, and we continually audit and update our software in order to equip our customers with the best digital intelligence solutions available." The report by Signal followed an announcement by Cellebrite in 2020 that it had developed technology to crack encrypted messages in the Signal app, a claim the company later retracted and downplayed.

The announcement by Marlinspike raised questions about the integrity of data extracted by the software, and prompted Cellebrite to patch some of the vulnerabilities found by Signal and to remove full support for analyzing iPhones.

Law enforcement assistance 
In April 2011, the Michigan chapter of the American Civil Liberties Union questioned whether Michigan State Police (MSP) troopers were using Cellebrite UFEDs to conduct unlawful searches of citizens' cell phones. Following its refusal to grant the ACLU of Michigan's 2008 Freedom of Information Act request unless the organization paid $544,000 to retrieve the reports, MSP issued a statement claiming that it honored the Fourth Amendment in searching mobile devices.

In March 2016, it was reported that Cellebrite offered to unlock an iPhone involved in the FBI–Apple encryption dispute. Later, after the FBI announced it had successfully accessed the iPhone thanks to a third party. A press report claimed Cellebrite had assisted with unlocking the device, which an FBI source denied.

A 2017 data dump suggests Cellebrite sold its data extraction products to Turkey, the United Arab Emirates and Russia.

On 16 September 2020, Haaretz reported how Cellebrite had provided Saudi Arabia with mobile phone hacking services. The staff at Cellebrite demanded the Saudis to send a government representative to meet one of their employees at the King Khalid International Airport in Riyadh. Following the demand, a representative of Cellebrite traveled to Riyadh in November 2019 for a hacking attempt on a phone in the possession of a Saudi Justice Ministry employee. The Cellebrite representative called for the authorities to let him pass through passport control without getting his passport stamped or his electronic equipment being checked, while remaining only under his possession. The hacker was supposed to head to an isolated hotel room from the airport, where the process was planned to be executed without any electronic surveillance. The Cellebrite representative then returned to the Riyadh airport to fly back to London.

In 2017, Cellebrite entered into a contract with U.S. Immigration and Customs Enforcement (ICE) for $2.2 Million. On June 24, 2019, another contract was signed with ICE for between $30 and $35 million. The 2019 contract was for “universal forensic extraction devices (UFED), accessories licenses, training and support services” for one year, with an option to extend for up to five years.

Hong Kong 
In August 2020, MIT Technology Review reported that Cellebrite sold its services to the Hong Kong Police Force for use in unlocking phones of detained demonstrators during the 2019–20 Hong Kong protests. As of October 7, 2020, the company announced that it would stop selling its solutions and services to customers in Hong Kong and China as a result of a change in U.S. regulations.

Eastern Europe 
Cellebrite's UFED program was used to persecute the democratic opposition in Belarus and Russia. In March 2021, after finding out that technology was used in the Lyubov Sobol affair, a Jerusalem activist filed a lawsuit against the company in the Israeli Supreme Court. The company announced the termination of cooperation with Russia and Belarus shortly afterwards.

Henry Borel Case 
In March 2021, the Civil Police of Rio de Janeiro State opened an investigation into the mysterious death of 4-year old Henry Borel. The boy's stepfather Jairinho and his mother Monique Medeiros were arrested for obstructing the investigation into the boy's death and were being investigated for homicide. Rio de Janeiro police used Cellebrite devices to extract deleted WhatsApp messages between Jairinho, Medeiros, and Henry's nanny, which the department described as "essential technical evidence" for the case.

Freeland and Wildlife Trafficking 
In October 2018, Freeland, a global, non-profit organization that fights wildlife and human trafficking, was called in to assist a Thai Police investigation into two Vietnamese males suspected of wildlife trafficking. Freeland's forensics experts were dispatched to the scene to provide on-the-job training. Using Cellebrite devices, police discovered evidence the poaching coordinators had arrived in Thailand to sponsor targeted hunting in Thailand, Malaysia and possibly Myanmar.

Leicestershire Police 
In November 2015, 15-year old Kayleigh Haywood from Measham, Leicestershire was found dead. Leicestershire Police used a Cellebrite device to unlock Kayleigh's badly damaged smartphone, which led them to who she had been talking to and their whereabouts. This evidence uncovered Kayleigh's murderer Stephen Beardman and her groomer, Luke Harlow, and cleared a suspect who was nowhere near the scene of the crime at the time of her murder.

Security breaches 

On 12 January 2017, it was reported that an unknown hacker had acquired 900 GB worth of confidential data from Cellebrite's external servers. The data dump includes alleged usernames and passwords for logging into Cellebrite databases connected to the company's my.cellebrite domain, and also contains what appear to be evidence files from seized mobile phones, and logs from Cellebrite devices. The dumped data suggested Cellebrite sold its data extraction products to countries such as Turkey, the United Arab Emirates and Russia.

References

Mobile phone companies of Israel
Software companies of Israel
Civil liberties in the United States
Companies listed on the Nasdaq
Data analysis software
Digital forensics software
Companies based in Petah Tikva
Software companies established in 1999
Special-purpose acquisition companies
Telecommunications companies established in 1999
Israeli companies established in 1999